Darreh Mianeh or Darreh Meyaneh or Darreh Miyaneh may refer to:
 Darreh Mianeh-ye Olya
 Darreh Mianeh-ye Sofla